Toni Matičevski (1976) is a Melbourne-based Australian fashion designer.

Matičevski's parents migrated from the then non-independent Republic of Macedonia when it was still part of Yugoslavia. He grew up in Seddon, an inner-Western suburb of Melbourne with a sizable Macedonian community.

Matičevski studied fashion at RMIT University graduating with First Class Honours. After graduating he won a Fashion Group International Award resulting in a placement with Donna Karan in New York. Matičevski turned down an extended position at Donna Karan, deeming the power house creatively draining. Matičevski left for Paris to work two seasons at Cerruti. Matičevski returned to Melbourne in 1998 to launch his own label. In 2002, Matičevski won Best New Designer at the L'Oréal Melbourne Fashion Festival with his debut demi-couture collection. The same year saw his preliminary participation in the Mercedes-Benz Australian Fashion Week spring and summer collections. In 2005 he tied with Kit Willow for the Prix de Marie Claire Best New Designer award.

Matičevski designs emotively, rejecting the norm to create such designs as his elegantly skeletal dresses, held together (or to hold you together) with a bondage system of raw edged silk straps. These ‘nonchalantly needy’ dresses result in the wearer appearing like an intricately tied up cloud.

Each season Matičevski recreates his elaborate gowns in different styles and materials while retaining a similar silhouette. Matičevski has recently added a men's line to his label with fluid draping neutral jackets and trousers.

Exhibitions
In 2016, a major exhibition of Matičevski's work is being held at the Bendigo Art Gallery. "Selected objects will be presented to illustrate the evolution of Toni Maticevski’s oeuvre, exploring his early influences through to his inspiration and recurrent themes in his current practice."

References

External links

 Official Toni Maticevski site

 Toni Maticevski at Vogue Australia
 

1977 births
Living people
People from Melbourne
Australian fashion designers
Australian company founders
Australian people of Macedonian descent
Helpmann Award winners
RMIT University alumni